Rossiya class is a class of Russian river passenger ships. "Rossiya" means "Russia" in Russian.

A two-deck luxury passenger ship manufactured in Soviet Union in 1973 to service higher state management. Currently belongs to the Administration of President of Russian Federation.

River passenger ships of the project 1877

Overview

References

External links 

River cruise ships
Ships of Russia
Ships of the Soviet Union
Ships built at Severnaya Verf